The Kokowara were an indigenous Australian people of the state of Queensland.

Name
The ethnonym, applied to them by other tribes, namely Kokowara, means 'rough speech'. Their autonym, or word for themselves, had not been ascertained as of 1974.

Country
Laura River. Their central camping area was at a place called Daidan on the Deighton River.

Alternative names
 Kookawarra
 Coo-oo-warra
 Gugu-Warra
 Laura-Deighton tribe

Notes

Citations

Sources

Aboriginal peoples of Queensland
Far North Queensland